Phyllobrostis tephroleuca is a moth in the  family Lyonetiidae. It is found in Gauteng, the Limpopo Province, Mpumalanga, KwaZulu-Natal and Zimbabwe.

The wingspan is 10-10.3 mm for males and 10.8–11 mm for females.

External links
Revision of the genus Phyllobrostis Staudinger, 1859 (Lepidoptera, Lyonetiidae)

Lyonetiidae
Moths of Africa
Moths described in 1913